Polyquaternium is the International Nomenclature for Cosmetic Ingredients designation for several polycationic polymers that are used in the personal care industry. Polyquaternium is a neologism used to emphasize the presence of quaternary ammonium centers in the polymer. INCI has approved at least 40 different polymers under the polyquaternium designation. Different polymers are distinguished by the numerical value that follows the word "polyquaternium". Polyquaternium-5, polyquaternium-7, and polyquaternium-47 are three examples, each a chemically different type of polymer. The numbers are assigned in the order in which they are registered rather than because of their chemical structure.

Polyquaterniums find particular application in conditioners,
shampoo, hair mousse, hair spray, hair dye, personal lubricant, and contact lens solutions. Because they are positively charged, they neutralize the negative charges of most shampoos and hair proteins and help hair lie flat. Their positive charges also ionically bond them to hair and skin. Some have antimicrobial properties.

See also 

Ionomer

References

Cosmetics chemicals
Polymers
Quaternary ammonium compounds